Huamanguilla District is one of eight districts of the province Huanta in Peru.

Ethnic groups 
The people in the district are mainly indigenous citizens of Quechua descent. Quechua is the language which the majority of the population (86.27%) learnt to speak in childhood, 13.39% of the residents started speaking using the Spanish language (2007 Peru Census).

Places of interest 
The archaeological site of Marayniyuq lies in the southwest of the district.

See also 
 Kunturmarka
 Yanaqucha

References